Peter Breinholtis a recording artist in the Salt Lake City, Utah local music scene.

Breinholt spent the first ten years of his life in Devon, Pennsylvania, a suburb of Philadelphia, where his father Robert H. Breinholt taught at the Wharton School of Business at the University of Pennsylvania. He is the brother of Jeffrey Breinholt.  He has three other siblings.

Career
While he was a student at the University of Utah, a homemade tape of Breinhot's songs began circulating around campus which led to a professional recording in a Salt Lake City recording studio in June 1993. That recording, called "Songs About the Great Divide", became the best-selling, independently released CD ever in the state of Utah, almost entirely by word-of-mouth. It was described by Salt Lake Magazine as "an underground classic on college campuses". Breinholt's concerts began selling out local theaters and concert halls, including Kingsbury Hall, Capitol Theatre, Tuacahn, the de Jong Concert Hall, Ellen Eccles Theatre, Sundance Resort Amphitheater, Sandy Amphitheater and the Thanksgiving Point Waterfall Amphitheater.

In 1999, Breinholt's music was used to demo and market computer company iOmega's PocketZip, a technological predecessor to the iPod. 

In 2000, Breinholt testified at a United States congressional hearing on the topic of digital file sharing. 

Peter's song "Lullaby" was one of the primary inspirations behind Tim Ballard's decision to leave his position with the FBI to start Operation Underground Railroad. Breinholt has since recorded a new version of the song with the One Voice Children's Choir and donated it to Ballard's organization.

In November 2016, Utah Governor Gary Herbert awarded Breinholt the Utah Governor's Mansion Artist Award for the Performing Arts.

In March 2019, Peter gave a TEDx talk in Provo, Utah, entitled "What Makes You Come Alive?".

Personal life
Peter is married to Rebecca Pulsipher Breinholt and they have four children. They live in the Avenues areas of Salt Lake City, Utah.

Recordings
Songs about the Great Divide (1993)
Heartland (1996)
Deep Summer (1999)
Live September (2001)
Noel (2002)
All the Color Green (2006)
The Best of Peter Breinholt (May 2008)
The Counting of Nothing (2018)

References

External links
 

1969 births
Living people
University of Utah alumni
Musicians from Utah
American folk musicians